Dr. Thomas A. Bland was a 19th-century physician, publisher, Indian Rights Activist, founder of the National Indian Defense Association "NIDA", and publisher of "The Council Fire and Arbitrator".

Early life and education
Born Thomas Augustus Bland on 21 May 1830 at Bloomfield, Indiana to Thomas Bland, a Quaker who hailed from North Carolina. Raised on a farm, Bland's early education was largely self-taught. He chose the career of a physician, graduating from the Eclectic College of Cincinnati, Ohio. In 1852 Bland married Mary Cornelia "Cora" Davis of Hitesville, Illinois.

Career

Bland served in the Civil War as a surgeon with the Union Army. Upon his discharge in 1864 he became the editor for the "Home Visitor" a literary weekly published in Indianapolis. His wife Cora, herself a fully trained medical doctor, was the associate editor. In 1865 he established the "Northwestern Farmer", which he sold in 1871. In 1870 Dr. Bland published his first book, "Farming as a Profession". In 1872 the Blands relocated to Chicago where he took over the editorship of the "Scientific Farmer". In 1872 they moved to New York where Bland assumed the editorship of the "Farm and Fireside". In 1879 Bland published his biographical work "Life of General B. F. Butler".
In 1878 the Blands took up permanent residence in Washington DC with the intent to devote their lives to politics and literature. During this time period the Blands met and befriended Colonel Alfred B. Meacham who was recovering from being nearly fatally shot by Modoc Indians in California a few years earlier. Through this association the Blands got interested in the Indian cause, dedicating the rest of their lives to combat and to rectify injustice done to America's indigenous people. The Blands, together with Colonel Meacham embarked on a lecture tour lasting several years speaking at hundreds of venues throughout the northeastern United States. Together with Meacham they published in 1878 "The Council Fire and Arbitrator", a monthly dedicated to the Indian Rights cause until it folded in 1889. The Blands distinguished themselves in their efforts, assisted by fellow Indian Rights activist Caroline Weldon, albeit ultimately unsuccessfully,  to fight the implementation of the Allotment Act (Dawes Act) which they deemed unfavorable to the Indians and a blatant attempt by the United States government to dispossess the Indians of much of the land guaranteed to them in numerous treaties.

Later years and death
In 1895 the Blands moved to Boston to continue with various publishing and literary endeavors. In 1898 they relocated to Chicago where Bland would live out the remainder of his days. He died on 3 January 1908.

References

1830 births
1908 deaths
19th-century American physicians
People from Bloomfield, Indiana